Mai Phương Thúy (August 6, 1988) is a Vietnamese actress, model and beauty pageant titleholder who was crowned the 10th Miss Vietnam at the Vinpearl Resort in Nha Trang, Vietnam on August 26, 2006. She represented Vietnam at the Miss World 2006 pageant in Warsaw, Poland on September 30, in the Asia-Pacific group. She made the first cut In Miss World 2006 by winning the viewers' votes around the world.

She had posed for  photographs  late in 2007 for the photographer Tran Huy Hoan; the set is described as "nude photos" - perhaps artistic but still risque for a "Miss Vietnam". Tran Huy Hoan has sold oil paintings of  a nude lady which bears a likeness to Mai Phương Thúy. She supports numerous social causes, notably the Vietnamese traffic problem.  She is the goodwill ambassador for the Asia Injury Prevention Foundation. She studied at Phan Dinh Phung high school and was accepted into the Foreign Trade University and RMIT University Vietnam. Besides being a beauty queen, with a background in her major in the economy, she is also a well-known stock investor in Vietnam.

Thúy did and still does many charity works and she also participated in a movie called "Âm tính" (Negative).

Biography 
Mai Phuong Thuy is the eldest sister in a family of two siblings. Her father Mai Xuan Quang died when she was six. Her mother Nguyen Phuong Lan used to be a tax officer.

Before competing Miss Vietnam 2006, she used to a model under New Talent Modelling Agency. She joined the agency via a friend's introduction.

She went to Thang Long secondary school and Phan Dinh Phung highschool. In 2006, she passed Foreign Trade University and had three scholarships from RMIT Vietnam. After the pageant, she studied at RMIT Vietnam.

Miss Vietnam 2006
The winner: Mai Phương Thúy (Hà Nội)
1st runner-up: Lưu Bảo Anh (Cần Thơ)
2nd runner-up: Lương Thị Ngọc Lan (Saigon)
Finalists: Nguyễn Thị Ngọc Anh (Hải Phòng), Phạm Thuý Trang (Saigon)
Semifinalists: Phạm Thị Thuỳ Dương (Hà Nội), Trần Thị Hương Giang (Hải Dương), Cao Thanh Hằng (Hà Nội), Trần Thanh Loan (Saigon), K' The (Lâm Đồng)

Winning 
In Miss Vietnam 2006, Mai Phuong Thuy with her measurement as: 1,79m in height and 60 kg. She set a record for being the tallest contestant in the history of Miss Vietnam since 1988-2012. She was kept being told to be the best candidate for Miss Vietnam 2006 during the pageant, along with Luu Bao Anh (Can Tho), Tran Thi Huong Giang (Hai Duong), Pham Thi Thuy Duong, Luong Thi Ngoc Lan,...

In the final night of the pageant, Mai Phuong Thuy was in top 5. Besides the top prize of the pageant, she was also the contestant who got the most votes via SMS.

Miss World 2006
Miss Vietnam 2006 Mai Phuong Thuy competed in Miss World 2006 pageant in Poland. Mai Phuong Thuy was the only East Asian contestant to join the top 17 in the final. She made the top 17 due to the highest online vote in her Asia-Pacific zone. Miss Czech Republic won the crown.

Movies
Âm tính (2009)
Mai Phương Thúy was cast as the main character Lam Uyen Nhi in the movie "Negative" (2009). The movie was about the real life Lam Uyen Nhi HIV/AIDs victim who suffers a life of unhappiness and loneliness.

References

Living people
1988 births
Miss World 2006 delegates
Miss Vietnam winners
People from Hanoi
Vietnamese actresses
Vietnamese female models
RMIT University Vietnam alumni
21st-century Vietnamese women